

Sources

 01
Family trees
Pahlav
P